Deicing is the process of removing snow, ice or frost from a surface. Anti-icing is the application of chemicals that not only deice but also remain on a surface and continue to delay the reformation of ice for a certain period of time, or prevent adhesion of ice to make mechanical removal easier.

Deicing can be accomplished by mechanical methods (scraping, pushing); through the application of heat; by use of dry or liquid chemicals designed to lower the freezing point of water (various salts or brines, alcohols, glycols); or by a combination of these different techniques.

Application areas

Roadways 
In 2013, an estimated 14 million tons of salt were used for deicing roads in North America.

Deicing of roads has traditionally been done with salt, spread by snowplows or dump trucks designed to spread it, often mixed with sand and gravel, on slick roads. Sodium chloride (rock salt) is normally used, as it is inexpensive and readily available in large quantities. It also has a tendency to cause corrosion, rusting the steel used in most vehicles and the rebar in concrete bridges. Depending on the concentration, it can be toxic to some plants and animals, and some urban areas have moved away from it as a result. More recent snowmelters use other salts, such as calcium chloride and magnesium chloride, which not only depress the freezing point of water to a much lower temperature, but also produce an exothermic reaction. They are somewhat safer for sidewalks, but excess should still be removed.

More recently, organic compounds have been developed that reduce the environmental issues connected with salts and have longer residual effects when spread on roadways, usually in conjunction with salt brines or solids. These compounds are often generated as byproducts of agricultural operations such as sugar beet refining or the distillation process that produces ethanol. Other organic compounds are wood ash and a deicing salt called calcium magnesium acetate made from roadside grass or even kitchen waste. Additionally, mixing common rock salt with some of the organic compounds and magnesium chloride results in spreadable materials that are both effective to much colder temperatures as well as at lower overall rates of spreading per unit area.

Solar road systems have been used to maintain the surface of roads above the freezing point of water. An array of pipes embedded in the road surface is used to collect solar energy in summer, transfer the heat to thermal banks and return the heat to the road in winter to maintain the surface above . This automated form of renewable energy collection, storage and delivery avoids the environmental issues of using chemical contaminants.

It was suggested in 2012 that superhydrophobic surfaces capable of repelling water can also be used to prevent ice accumulation leading to icephobicity. However, not every superhydrophobic surface is icephobic and the method is still under development.

Trains and rail switches 

Trains and rail switches in Arctic regions can have significant problems with snow and ice build up. They need a constant heat source on cold days to assure functionality. On trains it is primarily the brakes, suspension and couplers that require heaters for deicing. On rails it is primarily the switches that are sensitive to ice. High-powered electrical heaters prevent ice formation and rapidly melt any ice that forms.

The heaters are preferably made of PTC material, for example PTC rubber, to avoid overheating and potentially destroying the heaters. These heaters are self-limiting and require no regulating electronics; they cannot overheat and require no overheat protection.

Aviation

Ground deicing of aircraft 

On the ground, when there are freezing conditions and precipitation, deicing an aircraft is commonly practiced. Frozen contaminants interfere with the aerodynamic properties of the vehicle. Furthermore, dislodged ice can damage the engines.

Ground deicing methods include:
 Spraying on various aircraft deicing fluids to melt ice and prevent reformation
 Using unheated forced air to blow off loose snow and ice
 Using infrared heating to melt snow, ice, and frost without using chemicals
 Mechanical deicing using tools such as brooms, scrapers, and ropes
 Placing an aircraft in a warm hangar

In-flight deicing 

Ice can build up on aircraft in flight due to atmospheric conditions, causing potential degradation of flight performance.  Large commercial aircraft almost always have in-flight ice protections systems to shed ice buildup and prevent reformation.  Ice protection systems are
becoming increasingly common in smaller general aviation aircraft as well.

Ice protection systems typically use one or more of the following approaches:
 pneumatic rubber "boots" on leading edges of wings and control surfaces, which expand to break off accumulated ice
 electrically heated strips on critical surfaces to prevent ice formation and melt accumulated ice
 bleed air systems which take heated air from the engines and duct them to locations where ice can accumulate
 fluid systems which "weep" deicing fluid over wings and control surfaces via tiny holes

Airport pavement 
Deicing operations for airport pavement (runways, taxiways, aprons, taxiway bridges) may involve several types of liquid and solid chemical products, including propylene glycol, ethylene glycol and other organic compounds. Chloride-based compounds (e.g. salt) are not used at airports, due to their corrosive effect on aircraft and other equipment.

Urea mixtures have also been used for pavement deicing, due to their low cost. However, urea is a significant pollutant in waterways and wildlife, as it degrades to ammonia after application, and it has largely been phased out at U.S. airports. In 2012 the U.S. Environmental Protection Agency (EPA) prohibited use of urea-based deicers at most commercial airports.

Deicing chemicals 

All chemical deicers share a common working mechanism: they chemically prevent water molecules from binding above a certain temperature that depends on the concentration. This temperature is below 0 °C, the freezing point of pure water (freezing point depression). Sometimes, there is an exothermic dissolution reaction that allows for an even stronger melting power. The following lists contains the most-commonly used deicing chemicals and their typical chemical formula.

Salts

 Sodium chloride (NaCl or table salt; the most common deicing chemical)
 Magnesium chloride (often added to salt to lower its working temperature)
 Calcium chloride (often added to salt to lower its working temperature, attacks concrete
 Potassium chloride (KCl)
 Calcium magnesium acetate
 Potassium acetate
 Potassium formate
 Sodium formate (HCOONa)
 Calcium formate

Organics
 Urea, a common fertilizer
 Agricultural By-Products, generally used as additives to sodium chloride)
 Methanol, scarcely used on roads
 Ethylene glycol, scarcely used on roads
 Propylene glycol, scarcely used on roads
 Glycerol, scarcely used on roads

Environmental impacts and mitigation 

Deicing salts such as sodium chloride or calcium chloride leach into natural waters, strongly affecting their salinity.

Ethylene glycol and propylene glycol are known to exert high levels of biochemical oxygen demand (BOD) during degradation in surface waters. This process can adversely affect aquatic life by consuming oxygen needed by aquatic organisms for survival. Large quantities of dissolved oxygen (DO) in the water column are consumed when microbial populations decompose propylene glycol.

Some airports recycle used deicing fluid, separating water and solid contaminants, enabling reuse of the fluid in other applications. Other airports have an on-site wastewater treatment facility, and/or send collected fluid to a municipal sewage treatment plant or a commercial wastewater treatment facility.

See also 
 Atmospheric icing
 Pollution
 Winter service vehicle

References

External links 
 

Aviation safety
Aviation risks
Transport safety
Chemical processes
Ice in transportation
NASA spin-off technologies